Saccharibacillus endophyticus is a Gram-positive, facultatively anaerobic and endospore-forming bacteria from the genus of Saccharibacillus which has been isolated from the plant Gossypium hirsutum.

References

External links
Type strain of Saccharibacillus endophyticus at BacDive -  the Bacterial Diversity Metadatabase

Paenibacillaceae
Bacteria described in 2016